The Sea Owl is a  superyacht launched at the Feadship yard in De Kaag, in the Netherlands. London-based Andrew Winch Designs designed both the interior and exterior of the yacht.

Design 
The hull is steel while the superstructure is aluminium with teak laid decks. The yacht is Lloyd's registered, issued in the Bahamas.

Engines 
She is powered by twin MTU 16V 4000 M53R diesel engines.

See also
 List of motor yachts by length
 List of yachts built by Feadship

References

2013 ships
Motor yachts
Ships built in the Netherlands